Aidan McCormack (born 19 September 1992) is an Irish sportsperson. He plays hurling with his local club Thurles Sarsfields and with the Tipperary senior inter-county team since 2016.

Career
McCormack was part of the Tipperary Minor hurling panel in 2010, and the Under-21 hurling panel from 2011 to 2013. At club level, he is a five-time county medallist and a one-time Munster club medallist with Thurles Sarsfields.

McCormack made his Championship debut on 10 July 2016 against Waterford in the 2016 Munster Final, coming on in the 66th minute and scoring a point.

He was an unused substitute as Tipperary claimed their 27th All-Ireland Senior Hurling Championship with a 2-29 to 2-20 win over bitter rivals Kilkenny. It was his first All-Ireland medal.

McCormack made his starting debut on 11 February 2017 against Dublin in the 2017 National Hurling League. He excelled at corner-forward and scored 0-5 from play in an impressive display.

Honours
Tipperary
Munster Senior Hurling Championship (1): 2016
All-Ireland Senior Hurling Championship (1): 2016

Thurles Sarsfields
Tipperary Senior Hurling Championship (5): 2010, 2012, 2014, 2015, 2016, 2017
Munster Senior Club Hurling Championship (1): 2012
Tipperary Under-21 Hurling Championship (2): 2012, 2013
Tipperary Minor Hurling Championship (1): 2010

References

Tipperary inter-county hurlers
Thurles Sarsfields hurlers
Living people
Place of birth missing (living people)
1992 births